Warner University is a  private Christian university in Lake Wales, Florida. It is affiliated with the Church of God.

History 
Warner Southern College was founded in 1968 by the Southeastern Association of the Church of God in Anderson, Indiana. The first freshman class of 27 students entered in the fall of 1968. In 2008, the name was changed to Warner University.

Campus 

Student enrollment 
Enrollment hit an all-time record high of 1,215 students in the fall of 2017 and the university has a student-to-faculty ratio of 16:1. Its student body represents over 28 states and 19 countries. 43% of undergraduates at Warner University are first-generation college students. In 2019-2020, gender distribution was 54 percent male students and 46 percent female students.

Awards and recognition 
Warner University was ranked #63 the Regional Colleges South category of U.S. News & World Reports "Best Colleges."

Warner University's ranking in the 2020 edition of U.S. News & World Reports "Best Colleges" is #58 in the Regional Colleges South category. Schools are ranked according to their performance across a set of widely accepted indicators of excellence.

Academics 
Warner is accredited by the Commission on Colleges of the Southern Association of Colleges and Schools and offers over 30 undergraduate degree programs for traditional students. For working adults, Warner offers a Master of Business Administration, a Master of Arts in Education, a Master of Science in Management, a Bachelor of Science in Transformational Church Ministry, a Bachelor of Arts in Educational Studies, a Bachelor of Arts in Healthcare Management, and a Bachelor of Arts in Business Administration. These degrees are available in either an online or site-based format. In recent years, Warner added a Bachelor of Arts in Agricultural Studies.

Warner also supports a unique training facility known as the H.E.A.R.T. (Hunger Education and Resources Training) Institute. The HEART Institute is a simulated developing country village which trains students in missionary fieldwork while giving them an opportunity to live in an environment similar to many underdeveloped parts of the world.

Library 
The Pontious Learning Resource Center serves as the academic library at Warner University. Its collection includes approximately 95,000 books and 8,000 periodical subscriptions in several different formats. The Pontious Learning Resource Center also offers several specialized collections including the Curriculum Materials Center, Instructional Materials Lab, and the Pioneer Room. The Pioneer Room houses the Church of God and Warner University archival materials.

Athletics 

The Warner athletic teams are called the Royals. The university is a member of the National Association of Intercollegiate Athletics (NAIA), primarily competing in the Sun Conference (formerly known as the Florida Sun Conference (FSC) until after the 2007–08 school year) for most of its sports since the 1990–91 academic year; while its men's volleyball team competes in the Mid-South Conference (MSC). They are also a member of the National Christian College Athletic Association (NCCAA), primarily competing as an independent in the South Region of the Division I level.

Warner competes in 21 intercollegiate varsity sports: Men's sports include baseball, basketball, cross country, football, soccer, tennis, track & field and volleyball; women's sports include basketball, beach volleyball, cheerleading, cross country, dance, flag football, lacrosse, soccer, softball, tennis, track & field and volleyball; and co-ed sports include clay target. Former sports included men's & women's golf.

Volleyball
Warner was the first college/university to offer a varsity men's volleyball program in the state of Florida. The men's volleyball program participates in the Mid-South Conference (MSC). The program initially competed in the Mid-America Men's Volleyball Intercollegiate Conference (MAMVIC). The program made back-to-back appearances in the NAIA Men’s Volleyball National Invitational Tournament in 2011 and 2012.

See also 
 Independent Colleges and Universities of Florida

References

External links 
 Official website
 Official athletics website

 
Liberal arts colleges in Florida
Universities and colleges affiliated with the Church of God (Anderson, Indiana)
Educational institutions established in 1968
Council for Christian Colleges and Universities
Universities and colleges accredited by the Southern Association of Colleges and Schools
Universities and colleges in Polk County, Florida
1968 establishments in Florida
Private universities and colleges in Florida